Honoré Fabri (Honoratus Fabrius; 5 April 1607 or 8 April 1608 – 8 March 1688) was a French Jesuit theologian, also known as Coningius. He was a mathematician, physicist and controversialist.

Life

He entered the Society of Jesus at Avignon, in 1626. For eight years he taught philosophy and for six years mathematics at the Jesuit college at Lyons, attracting many pupils. Called to Rome, he became the theologian of the court of the papal penitentiary in the Vatican basilica, a position he held for thirty years. 

Fabri was a highly respected scientist among his contemporaries. He was elected to the Accademia del Cimento in 1657, the year the Academy was founded. Leibniz placed him with Galileo, Torricelli, Steno and Borelli for his work on elasticity and the theory of vibrations, and alone with Galileo for his efforts to 'rationalise experimental kinematics'. Mersenne rated him 'a veritable giant in science'

Works

Sommervogel mentions thirty-one titles of published works in connection with Fabri's name, besides fourteen of his productions in manuscript, in the Library of Lyons.

The following are the more important of his publications:

 Tractatus physicus du motu locali (1646).
 Metaphysica Demonstrativa, Sive Scientia Rationum Universalium (Lyon, 1648).
 Pithanophilus, seu dialogus vel opusculum de opinione probabili, etc. (Rome, 1659).

This work was attacked by Stefano Gradi, Prefect of the Vatican Library, in his Disputatio de opinione probabili (Rome, 1678; Mechlin, 1679).

 Honorati Fabri, Societatis Jesu, apolgeticus doctrinæ moralis ejusdem Societatis, (Lyons, 1670; Cologne, 1672).

This treats, in eleven dialogues, of probabilism, explaining its true nature, and refuting the charges of its opponents. The Cologne edition was considerably enlarged but did not meet with ecclesiastical approbation; it was placed on the Index of forbidden books soon after its appearance.

 Una fides unius Ecclesiæ Romanæ contra indifferentes hujus sæculi tribus librus facili methodo asserto, (Dillingen, 1657).
 Summula theologica in quâ quæstiones omnes alicujus momenti, quæ a Scholasticus agitari solent, breviter discutiuntur ac definiuntur, (Lyons, 1669).

The principles on which this work constructs its theological conclusions are far different from those of Aristotle.

 Euphiander seu vir ingeniosus, (Lyons, 1669; Vienna, 1731; Budapest, 1749; Ofen, 1763).

Most of Fabri's other works deal with philosophy, mathematics, physics, astronomy, and even zoology. In his treatise on man he claims to have discovered the circulation of the blood, prior to William Harvey, but after having investigated this question, Father :fr:Auguste Bellynck arrives at the conclusion that, at best, Father Fabri may have made the discovery independently of Harvey.

See also
List of Roman Catholic scientist-clerics

References

Further reading

Sommervogel, Bibl. de la C. de J. (Brussels and Paris, 1892), III, 511–521;
Hugo von Hurter, Nomenclator Literarius (Innsbruck 1893), tom. II, 598–600.
Palmerino, Carla Rita, "Fabri, Honoré (c. 1608–1688)", in : Dictionary of Seventeenth Century French Philosophers, ed. Luc Foisneau, London – New York : Thoemmes – Continuum, 2008, vol. I, 453–460

External links
 
Honoré Fabri, S.J. (1607 to 1688) and his post-calculus geometry
 
Galileo Project page
 Honoré's (1667) Synopsis optica - digital facsimile from the Linda Hall Library

1688 deaths
17th-century French Jesuits
1608 births
17th-century French mathematicians
Jesuit scientists
17th-century French Catholic theologians